The 1942 USC Trojans football team represented the University of Southern California (USC) in the 1942 college football season. In their first year under head coach Jeff Cravath, the Trojans compiled a 5–5–1 record (4–2–1 against conference opponents), finished in fourth place in the Pacific Coast Conference, and were outscored by their opponents by a combined total of 184 to 128.

Schedule

References

USC
USC Trojans football seasons
USC Trojans football